The Poem of the Soul is a series of oil on canvas paintings by Louis Janmot, produced between 1835 and 1881 and totalling eighteen paintings and sixteen charcoal drawings, all inspired by a 2800 verse poem by Janmot himself. The first works in the series were exhibited at the 1855 Exposition Universelle. The series tells of a soul's life on earth, incarnated in a young man, accompanied by his female double. His companion then disappears and he spends the rest of his life alone, as did the artist. The series is now in the Museum of Fine Arts of Lyon.

Sources

1830s paintings
1840s paintings
1850s paintings
1860s paintings
1870s paintings
1880s paintings
French paintings
Paintings in the collection of the Museum of Fine Arts of Lyon